Cory English (born 1968) is an American actor.

Early life 
Born into a blue collar family in Rochester, New York, English was the youngest of four boys. English attended Wayne Central High School in Ontario, New York. He lived for several years in New York City.

Career 
His West End credits include Chicago, and Guys and Dolls. In 2014 and 2015, English starred in a UK national tour of the Mel Brooks musical The Producers as Max Bialystock.

English worked on Young Frankenstein, another Mel Brooks musical, playing the part of Igor in a New York City production of Young Frankenstein in 2008, replacing Christopher Fitzgerald. He reprised that appearance for a United States national tour, which also featured former Broadway co-stars Roger Bart and Shuler Hensley.

In 2013, English appeared at Portland Center Stage in Somewhere in Time.

English had a brief, uncredited appearance in the mockumentary talent show Britain's Got the Pop Factor... and Possibly a New Celebrity Jesus Christ Soapstar Superstar Strictly on Ice aired on Channel 4 in October 2008. English played a helium balloon inhaling singer auditionee, giving his rendition of Mika's hit Grace Kelly. English and Kay had worked together previously (Kay playing flamboyant, gay director Roger De Bris) in The Producers at the Palace Theatre, Manchester in 2007.

In 2017, English returned to the role of Igor in Young Frankenstein at the West End's Garrick Theatre.

English starred as Maître D' in the 2019 film Cats. English also currently plays The Great Raven in the new animated series Hilda.

References

External links

Q&A with Cory English
Official site
Broadway World

1968 births
Living people
American male musical theatre actors
American male television actors
Alumni of the Drama Studio London
Male actors from Rochester, New York
People from Ontario, New York